The men's coxed four was a rowing event held as part of the Rowing at the 1912 Summer Olympics programme. It was the second appearance of the event, which had been held at the 1900 Summer Olympics but had been replaced by coxless four at the 1904 and 1908 Games. The standard coxed four event allowed for outriggers, while another event was held in 1912 for boats with inriggers. The competition was held from 17 to 19 July 1912.

Fifty six rowers (11 boats) from nine nations competed. Germany replaced their coxswain, maybe the Danish Polyteknisk replaced a rower, but this possible change is not counted.

Starting list

The following boats and/or rowing clubs participated:

 Ruderverein Germania, Leibnitz (other sources report Leitmeritz)
 Royal Sport Nautique de Gand
 København Roklubb
 Polyteknisk Roklub
 Helsingfors R. K.
 Société Nautique de Bayonne
 Ludwigshafener Ruderverein
 Thames Rowing Club
 Christiania RK
 Studenternes Roklub
 Vaxholm Roddklubb

Background

This was the second appearance of the event. Rowing had been on the programme in 1896 but was cancelled due to bad weather. The coxed four was one of the four initial events introduced in 1900. It was not held in 1904 or 1908, but was held at every Games from 1912 to 1992 when it (along with the men's coxed pair) was replaced with the men's lightweight double sculls and men's lightweight coxless four.

At these Games, club teams competed rather than representative national sides. Ludwigshafener Ruderverein, a German club that earned bronze in 1900, was the only team to return (with an entirely new crew) from the Paris Games. Italian (1909 and 1910) and Swiss (1911 and 1912) crews had won the last four European championships, but did not compete in Stockholm. The favourites among the competing teams were Ludwigshafener and the British Thames Rowing Club, winners at Henley in 1909 and 1911.

Austria, Belgium, Denmark, Finland, Great Britain, Norway, and Sweden each made their debut in the event. France and Germany competed for the second time, having appeared at the only previous edition in 1900.

Competition format

The coxed four event featured five-person boats, with four rowers and a coxswain. It was a sweep rowing event, with the rowers each having one oar (and thus each rowing on one side). It was the first Games to use the 2000 metres distance, which has been used ever since except at the 1948 Games.

The tournament featured four rounds of competition, with no repechages. Each race was head-to-head, with the winner advancing and the loser eliminated. There were 13 boats entered, so 7 heats were scheduled in the first round (including one bye); 2 boats withdrew, so 3 of the 7 heats ended up being walkovers. The quarterfinals featured 4 heats, again including one bye. There were 2 semifinals and 1 final.

Schedule

Results

First round

All heats were held on Wednesday, 17 July.

Heat 1

6.20 p.m. The Danish boat raced without opponent.

Heat 2

6.40 p.m.

Heat 3

7 p.m.

Heat 4

7.20 p.m.

Heat 5

7.40 p.m.

Heat 6

8 p.m.

Heat 7

8.20 p.m.

Quarterfinals

All quarterfinals were held on Thursday, 18 July.

Quarterfinal 1

12.20 p.m.

Quarterfinal 2

12.40 p.m.

Quarterfinal 3

1 p.m.

Quarterfinal 4

1.20 p.m. The German team had no opponent.

Semifinals

Both semifinals were held on Friday, 19 July.

Semifinal 1

1.30 p.m.

Semifinal 2

2 p.m.

Final

The final was held on Friday, 19 July at 5.30 p.m.

References

Sources
 
 

Rowing at the 1912 Summer Olympics